Margot Sofie Walle (11 November 1921 – 26 February 1990) was a Norwegian pair skater. She competed at the 1948 Winter Olympics, where she placed 10th with partner Allan Fjeldheim. She was Norwegian pairs champion in 1946, 1947, 1948 and 1949.

Results
(with Allan Fjeldheim)

References

External links

1921 births
1990 deaths
Norwegian female pair skaters
Olympic figure skaters of Norway
Figure skaters at the 1948 Winter Olympics
20th-century Norwegian women